Kambly is a Swiss biscuit factory based in Trubschachen (Bern). It was founded in 1910 by Oscar Kambly in the Emmental region.

Today, Kambly is one of Switzerland's largest biscuit producers. Kambly products are exported in more than 30 different countries.

The oldest product is the "Bretzeli", which has been baked since 1906 by Oscar Kambly for the inhabitants of the valley. The biscuits are made with milk and eggs from the Emmental.

References

External links
Official website

Companies established in 1910
Swiss brands
Brand name chocolate
Food and drink companies established in 1910
Canton of Bern
Biscuit brands